The Wilhelm Exner Medal has been awarded by the Austrian Industry Association,  (ÖGV), for excellence in research and science since 1921.

The medal is dedicated to Wilhelm Exner (1840–1931), former president of the Association, who initialized the chamber of commerce in Austria, the Vienna Technical Museum and the World Exhibition in Vienna. According to Wilhelm Exner the combination of science and economy formed the groundwork for economical growth and wealth. Wilhelm Exner considered the radical changes in the economic and social framework of the 20th century to be an opportunity and aimed to tackle the issues arising offensively and constructively. He represented the cosmopolitan Austrian liberalism with a commitment to modernization and transformation of the economy, science and society. Throughout his career, he has taken a variety of key initiatives and has been involved by helping economy and business.

The Wilhelm Exner Medal is awarded to scientists and researchers that have had a direct impact on business and industry through their scientific achievements and contributions. The award was created to honor the 60th anniversary of Wilhelm Exner's association with ÖGV. The selection of the scientist to be honored takes place at the suggestion and consultation of the former medalists and is confirmed by the board of the Wilhelm Exner Foundation and by the board of the Austrian Entrepreneur´s Association.

Since the Wilhelm Exner Medal was established, over 230 inventors, researchers and scientists have been honored, including 21 Nobel Prize awardees.

The medal
The medal has a diameter of 7.5 cm and is made of bronze. It bears on the front of the picture and the signature Wilhelm Exner, on the back the inscription: "Wilhelm Exner Medal of the Austrian Trade Association in Vienna"; the name of the individual to which the medal was awarded; and the year of the award.

Wilhelm Exner Lectures
In order to honor the new Wilhelm Exner Medalists, the Exner Lectures offer a symposium where the awarded scientists present their current topics of research. The lectures complement the festive ceremony of the medal and offer an opportunity to bring the economic and scientific communities together. Each year, the Association sends out a signal that the cooperative interaction between researchers and entrepreneurs is the basis for prosperity and growth.

Recipients
Source: Wilhelm Exner Medal Foundation

2020s 

 Katalin Karikó and Luisa Torsi (jointly), 2021
 Edward Boyden, 2020

2010s

Joseph M. DeSimone, 2019
, 2018
Thomas Jennewein, 2018
Zhenan Bao, 2018
A. Paul Alivisatos, 2018
Fabiola Gianotti, 2017
Chad Mirkin, 2017
Emmanuelle Charpentier, 2016
Gero Miesenböck, 2016
Stefan Hell, 2016  
Johann Eibl, 2016
Sir Gregory Winter, 2015
Thomas J.R. Hughes, 2014
Joseph M. Jacobson, 2013
, 2013
Ted Hänsch, 2012
Robert Langer, 2012
, 2012
Michael Grätzel, 2011
Manfred Eigen, 2011
Bertil Andersson, 2010
Ada Yonath, 2010

2000s

Sir Alan Fersht, 2009  
, 2009  
Zdenek Bazant, 2008  
, 2008  
, 2007  
Peter Palese, 2007  
Shuguang Zhang, 2006  
, 2006  
, 2005  
Hermann Kopetz, 2005  
Anton Zeilinger, 2005  
Meir Wilchek, 2004  
, 2004
Helmut List, 2003  
, 2003  
, 2003  
, 2002  
Ferdinand Piëch, 2002  
Andreas Plückthun, 2002  
Georg Brasseur, 2001  
Friedrich Dorner, 2001  
, 2001  
Rudolf Rigler, 2000  
, 2000  
, 2000

1990s

Peter Schuster, 1999  
Henry Baltes, 1999  
Gottfried Konecny, 1999  
Uwe B. Sleytr, 1998  
Heinz W. Engl, 1998  
Heiner Ryssel, 1998  
Klaus Pinkau, 1997  
Hans A. Leopold, 1997  
Charles Weissmann, 1997  
Ingeborg Hochmair-Desoyer, 1996  
Herbert Mang, 1996  
Heinrich Klaus Peter Ursprung, 1996  
Bengt Gustaf Rånby, 1996  
Jozef Stefaan Schell, 1995  
Gottfried Biegelmeier, 1995  
Bruno Buchberger, 1995  
Siegfried Selberherr, 1994
Max L. Birnstiel, 1994  
Josef Singer, 1994  
Hellmut Fischmeister, 1993  
Hans Junek, 1993  
Aladar Szalay, 1993  
Willibald Riedler, 1992  
Peter Komarek, 1992  
Karl Hermann Spitzy, 1992  
Michael J. Higatsberger, 1991  
Karl Schlögl, 1991  
Herwig Schopper, 1991  
Takeo Saegusa, 1990  
, 1990  
Gernot Zippe, 1990

1980s

Hubert Bildstein, 1988  
Helmut Zahn, 1988  
Gyözö Kovács, 1988  
Reimar Lüst, 1987  
Otto Vogl, 1987  
Karl Alexander Müller, 1987  
, 1986  
Horst Dieter Wahl, 1986  
Gerhard Dorda, 1986  
Helmut Rauch, 1985  
Heinz Maier-Leibnitz, 1985  
Ernst Fiala, 1985  
Karl Rinner, 1984  
Egon Schubert, 1984  
Adolf Birkhofer, 1984  
Walter Heywang, 1983  
Kurt Magnus, 1983  
Ernst Brandl, 1983  
Sir Stanley Hooker, 1982  
Hendrik Brugt Gerhard Casimir, 1982  
Edmund Hlawka, 1982  
Josef Schurz, 1981  
Anton Pischinger, 1981  
Adriaan van Wijngaarden, 1981  
Willem Johan Kolff, 1980  
Otto Hittmair, 1980  
Günther Wilke, 1980  
Ernst Fehrer, 1980

1970s

Winfried Oppelt, 1979  
Ferry Porsche, 1979  
Christian Veder, 1979  
Alfred Kastler, 1979  
Max Auwärter, 1978  
Hans Tuppy, 1978  
Friedrich Ludwig Bauer, 1978  
Viktor Hauk, 1977  
Hans Scherenberg, 1977  
Fritz Paschke, 1977  
Erwin Plöckinger, 1977  
Theodor Wasserrab, 1976  
Ferdinand Steinhauser, 1976  
Ferdinand Beran, 1976  
Ladislaus von Rabcewicz, 1975  
Klaus Oswatitsch, 1975  
Herbert Döring, 1975  
August F. Witt, 1975  
Sir Godfrey Newbold Hounsfield, 1974  
, 1974  
Roland Mitsche, 1974  
Peter Klaudy, 1974  
Richard Kieffer, 1973  
Otto Kraupp, 1973  
Otto Hromatka, 1973  
Guido Peter Pirquet, 1973  
Bruno Kralowetz, 1973  
Heinz Zemanek, 1972  
Eberhard Spenke, 1972  
Willibald Jentschke, 1971  
Karl Ziegler, 1971  
Hans List, 1971  
Sir Alastair Pilkington, 1970  
Otto Kratky, 1970  
Herbert Trenkler, 1970  
Charles Hard Townes, 1970

1960s

Wolfgang Gröbner, 1969  
Wernher von Braun, 1969  
Philip Weiss, 1969  
Konrad Zuse, 1969  
Hermann Oberth, 1969  
Hans Nowotny, 1969  
Richard Kwizda, 1968  
Leopold Küchler, 1968  
Adolf Leonhard, 1968  
Sir William Penney, 1967  
Max Ferdinand Perutz, 1967  
Karl V. Kordesch, 1967  
Sir Henry Charles Husband, 1966  
Fritz Wessely, 1966  
Fritz Stüssi, 1966  
Fritz Regler, 1965  
Adolf Slattenschek, 1965  
Adolf Pucher, 1965  
William Shockley, 1963  
Philip Sporn, 1963  
Eduard Justi, 1963  
Theodore von Kármán, 1962  
Franz Patat, 1962  
Albert Caquot, 1962  
Sir John Douglas Cockcroft, 1961  
, 1961
Paul Harteck, 1961  
Sir Howard Walter Florey, 1960  
Lise Meitner, 1960  
Eugène Freyssinet, 1960

1950s

Richard Joseph Neutra, 1959
Reinhard Straumann, 1959
Carl Wagner, 1959
Otto Hahn, 1958
Sir Alexander Fleck, 1957
Pier Luigi Nervi, 1957
Josef Mattauch, 1957
Fritz Feigl, 1957
Erika Cremer, 1957
Erich Schmid, 1957
Sir Christopher Hinton, 1956
Johann Arvid Hedvall, 1956
Heinrich Sequenz, 1956
Franz Holzinger, 1956
Paul Schwarzkopf, 1955
Ferdinand Campus, 1955
Bernhard Moritz Gerbel, 1955
Gustav Hüttig, 1954
Geoffrey Taylor, 1954
Eduardo Torroja, 1954
Berta Karlik, 1954
Karl Girkmann, 1953
Hans Lieb, 1953
Richard Johann Kuhn, 1952
Gustav Adolf Schwaiger, 1952
Ludwig Prandtl, 1951
Karl Holey, 1951
Eduard Heinl, 1951

1940s
Not awarded, due to World War II

1930s

Sir Harold Hartley, 1937  
Friedrich Bergius, 1937  
Ernst Späth, 1937  
Lord Ernest Rutherford of Nelson, 1936  
Franz Joseph Emil Fischer, 1936  
Ferdinand Porsche, 1936  
Wolf Johannes Müller, 1935  
Arne Frederic Westgren, 1935  
Hermann F. Mark, 1934  
Guglielmo Marconi, 1934  
Otto Waldstein, 1932  
Friedrich Ignaz von Emperger, 1932  
Carl Bosch, 1932  
Rudolf Saliger, 1931  
Carl Hochenegg, 1931  
Johannes Ruths, 1930  
Johann Kremenezky, 1930  
, 1930

1920s

Paul Ludwik, 1929  
Fritz Haber, 1929  
Mirko Gottfried Ros, 1928  
Friedrich Gebers, 1928  
Hugo Junkers, 1927  
Heinrich Mache, 1927  
Michael Hainisch, 1926  
Georg Wilhelm Graf von Arco, 1926. The city of Arco, Idaho is named after him.
Ernst Krause, machine tools & trade associations, 1926  
Rudolf Halter, 1925  
Carl Julius von Bach, 1924  
Wilhelm Ostwald, 1923  
Rudolf Wegscheider, 1923  
Josef Maria Eder, 1923  
Hubert Engels, 1923  
Alfred Collmann, 1923  
Carl Paul Gottfried von Linde, 1922  
Wilhelm Exner, 1921  
Oskar von Miller, 1921  
Carl Auer von Welsbach, 1921

See also 

 List of general science and technology awards

References

External links

Wilhelm Exner Medal awardees at Wilhelm Exner Medal

Austrian science and technology awards
Awards established in 1921
1921 establishments in Austria